Saskatchewan, a Canadian province , has received numerous royal visits since 1901. The current Canadian monarch has visited Saskatchewan six times. Other members of the Canadian Royal Family have also paid visits.

List of royal visits

References
Saskatchewan Legislative Library

External links
The 1939 Royal Train / Royal Tour of Canada at ThemeTrains.com.

Political history of Saskatchewan
Saskatchewan